Mark Davis (born October 11, 1963) is a professional sport fisherman of the Bass Anglers Sportsman Society (B.A.S.S.) and is one of only two anglers to have won the B.A.S.S. Angler of the Year and the Bassmasters Classic tournament in the same year.

Biography
Davis was born in Mount Ida, Arkansas. He has competed in 234 tournaments, and had five first-place finishes and forty-five top ten finishes.

He resides in Mount Ida, with his wife Tilly and their three children James, Hunter and Fisher,

Career Stats
Tournaments Entered: 250
Winnings: $1,683,702.30
Wins: 6
Top 10s: 51
Money finishes: 167

Awards

3-time B.A.S.S. Angler of the Year (1995, 1998, 2001)
1995 Bassmaster Classic Champion

See also
 Angling
 Bass fishing
 Bass Anglers Sportsman Society
 Bassmaster Classic
 Fishing tournament

Video games
Mark Davis' The Fishing Master (known as Oomono Black Bass Fishing: Jinzouko-Hen in Japan) (Japan, 1995; North America, 1996)
Mark Davis Pro Bass Challenge (PS2, 2003; Nintendo GameCube, 2005)

References

External links
 Bassmaster Home Page
 Texas Bass Fishing Home Page

1963 births
Living people
American fishers
People from Mount Ida, Arkansas
American male video game actors